The Trofeu Individual Bancaixa "Bancaixa one-on-one trophy") is the Escala i corda singles league played by Valencian pilota professionals and promoted by the Bancaixa bank.

Statistics

Relevant facts about the Trofeu Individual Bancaixa 
 Grau has been the only mitger who won a competition almost always played by dauers.

Specific rules 
 Matches begin with a draw: 10–10 jocs.

Seasons 
 Trofeu Individual Bancaixa 2007

See also 
 Valencian pilota
 Escala i corda
 Circuit Bancaixa

External links 
 Youtube: 7 videos featuring the 1993 final match, Genovés I vs. Sarasol I
 Google Video: Last games of the 1995 final match, Genovés I vs. Álvaro
 Google Video: 2004 Final match, Álvaro vs. Genovés II, complete

1986 establishments in Spain
Valencian pilota competitions
Valencian pilota professional leagues